Phil Rainford is a British former singer and music producer, who formed part of the Manchester music scene, in late 1970s and early 1980s. He was the original singer of post-punk band The Durutti Column who were signed to Factory Records, having joined the band in early 1978.  He was sacked in July of that year, for not being a considered correct choice. He did not release any material with the band other than a couple of pieces on a Factory Records sample release. At the time he was also known as "Phil Raincoat".

He later reappeared as producer for two albums for singer Nico: Live Heroes and Femme Fatale. He engineered and mixed another Nico's live album, Do or Die: Diary 1982. Phil is one of the "stars"/driver in James Young's book about Nico's time in Manchester and touring Europe "Songs they Never Play on the Radio". He also mixed the Musical Revue album for Suns of Arqa, also known as Live with Prince Far-I, although his surname is curiously misspelled 'Qainford' on the credits.

He recorded with the post punk band "Pure Product" . They released two albums Dreamworld and Rejection between 1978 and 1981.

He has lived in Edinburgh for the last 23 years and was involved in the club scene there. Occasionally being a DJ but mainly involved backstage.

In 2010, he took up acting and attended the PASS "Performing Arts Studio Scotland" and has pursued this profession ever since.

References

British record producers
British rock singers
Living people
Musicians from Manchester
The Durutti Column members
Year of birth missing (living people)